Sir David James Carruthers  (born ) is a long-serving member of the New Zealand legal community. He worked as a lawyer in Wellington, Pahiatua and Palmerston North, before being appointed as a Family Court Judge in 1985. In 2001, Carruthers was appointed as Chief District Court Judge, a position he held until 2005, when he was appointed as the chairman of the New Zealand Parole Board. In 2012, Carruthers joined the Independent Police Conduct Authority as its chairman. Since 2021 Carruthers has been the Independent Implementation Monitor to oversee the implementation of the recommendations of the Victorian Royal Commission into the Management of Police Informants.

Early life and family
Carruthers was born in 1940 or 1941, and raised in Pahiatua, New Zealand. He went on to study law, graduating LLB from Victoria University of Wellington in 1962. He completed his LLM with honours two years later.

Carruthers is married and has five children.

Career

Legal practice
Carruthers practised law in Wellington and Pahiatua for 20 years before moving to Palmerston North.

Judiciary
In 1985, Carruthers was appointed as a judge in the Family Court in Wellington. Five years later he became a judge in the Youth Court, eventually being appointed as Principal Youth Court Judge. In 2000, Carruthers was asked to lead a Ministerial Taskforce on Youth Offending to come up with initiatives designed to reduce youth crime after Ministry of Justice figures showed that "over the 1990s, offending by 10- to 16-year-olds increased by 55%". In 2001, Carruthers was appointed as Chief District Court Judge, a position he held until 2005.

Carruthers also served as a judge on the High Court of Vanuatu.

New Zealand Parole Board
Carruthers was appointed Chairman of the New Zealand Parole Board in 2005, a position he held until 2012. He was head of the Board when it made the decision to release Graeme Burton from prison in July 2006. Six months later, Burton shot and killed Karl Kuchenbecker in the hills of Wainuiomata and injured a number of others.

Independent Police Conduct Authority
In April 2012, Parliament appointed Carruthers as the new chairman of the Independent Police Conduct Authority (IPCA).

Independent Implementation Monitor
On 1 March 2021 it was announced that Carruthers would be appointed to the role of Independent Implementation Monitor to oversee the implementation of the recommendations of the Victorian Royal Commission into the Management of Police Informants. Carruthers provided his first report to the Attorney-General in September 2021. This report provided information to the Attorney-General for their first report to Parliament on the progress of implementation of the Royal Commission’s recommendations which was tabled in the Victorian parliament on 30 November 2021.

Public speeches
Carruthers has given speeches at numerous conferences and seminars both in New Zealand and overseas. For many years he has pushed for a more humane approach to dealing with criminal offenders advocating, in particular, for increased use of restorative and therapeutic justice approaches. He has held a number of public and charitable offices and recommended greater focus on education, and interventions for youth and families rather than locking up more and more offenders. Speaking at a criminology conference in November 2012, Carruthers commented on the reduction in New Zealand's crime rate. He believes the drop may be due to efforts to reduce the number of teenagers being suspended or expelled from school.

Honours and awards
In 1990, Carruthers was awarded the New Zealand 1990 Commemoration Medal. In the 2005 Queen’s Birthday Honours, he was appointed as a Distinguished Companion of the New Zealand Order of Merit, for services to the District Court. In 2009, following the reinstatement of titular honours by the New Zealand government, Carruthers accepted re-designation as a Knight Companion of the New Zealand Order of Merit.

References

1940s births
Living people
Year of birth missing (living people)
People from Pahiatua
Victoria University of Wellington alumni
New Zealand judges on the courts of Vanuatu
District Court of New Zealand judges
20th-century New Zealand lawyers
Knights Companion of the New Zealand Order of Merit
21st-century New Zealand lawyers
Family Court of New Zealand judges